Harlech railway station is located at a level crossing on the A496 in the centre of the town of Harlech in Gwynedd, North Wales. The waiting shelters were installed to cater for the high numbers of schoolchildren commuting to and from the adjacent secondary school, Ysgol Ardudwy.

The station is on the Cambrian Coast Railway with passenger services to Porthmadog, Pwllheli, Barmouth, Machynlleth, Shrewsbury and Birmingham International. Until the 1960s there was a summer service between London Paddington and Pwllheli, via Birmingham Snow Hill, Shrewsbury and Machynlleth.

History 

From January to April 2014, the line from Machynlleth was out of service for repairs due to storm damage north of Barmouth and a replacement bus service was in operation - this was due to the major repairs required to the formation (which required a complete rebuild of the sea wall as well as the track bed at Llanaber). Services to the north were also suspended until the beginning of September 2014 whilst a replacement for the Grade II-listed 1867 wooden viaduct at Pont Briwet was being constructed.

Services 
Trains stop approximately once every 2 hours in each direction Mondays - Saturdays. There are 3 trains each way in the summer season (May to September) on Sundays, but just one in each direction in the winter months.

References

Sources

External links

 RAILSCOT on Aberystwith and Welsh Coast Railway

Railway stations in Gwynedd
DfT Category F1 stations
Former Cambrian Railway stations
Railway stations in Great Britain opened in 1867
Railway stations served by Transport for Wales Rail
Harlech